Tate v Williamson (1886) LR 2 Ch App 55 is an English contract law case relating to undue influence.

Facts
The defendant became the financial adviser to an Oxford University undergraduate who sold him his estate for half its value and then drank himself to death, aged 24. The executors applied for the transaction to be set aside.

Judgment
Lord Chelmsford held that the executors would be successful in setting the contract aside. ‘The jurisdiction exercised by courts of equity over the dealings of persons standing in certain fiduciary relations has always been regarded as one of the most salutary description… The courts have always been careful not to fetter this jurisdiction by defining the exact limits of its exercise.’

See also

English contract law
Iniquitous pressure in English law
Lloyds Bank Ltd v Bundy [1975] QB 326
Williams v. Walker-Thomas Furniture Co. 350 F.2d 445 (C.A. D.C. 1965)

Notes

References

English unconscionability case law
House of Lords cases
1886 in case law
1886 in British law